is an amateur Japanese Greco-Roman wrestler, who played for the men's heavyweight category. Katō represented Japan at the 2008 Summer Olympics, where he competed for the men's 96 kg class. He lost the qualifying round match to Italy's Daigoro Timoncini, who was able to score eight points in two straight periods, leaving Kato without a single point.

References

External links
Profile – International Wrestling Database
NBC 2008 Olympics profile

Japanese male sport wrestlers
1980 births
Living people
Olympic wrestlers of Japan
Wrestlers at the 2008 Summer Olympics
Sportspeople from Aichi Prefecture
20th-century Japanese people
21st-century Japanese people